Ofelia Guilmáin (November 17, 1921 – January 14, 2005) was a Spaniard-Mexican actress of telenovelas, stage and the cinema of Mexico.

She is also the mother of actors Juan Ferrara and Lucía Guilmáin. Two of her grandchildren, sons of Ferrara, Mauricio and Juan Carlos Bonet, are also actors.

Biography
Ofelia Guilmáin was born in Madrid, Spain.

She was part of the Guerrillas of Theater groups in Spain set up by the republican government. When Francisco Franco came to power, she left her country as did many other artists and intellectuals. She arrived with her family in Mexico in 1939 and debuted in theater the following year in the play Mujeres. In 1940, she made her first film El capitán estrella and married Lucilo Gutiérrez next year. She retired from show business for a decade and became a Mexican citizen in 1952.

She made approximately 41 telenovelas, 39 movies and 100 plays. Hugo Argüelles wrote La ronda de la hechizada specifically for her in 1968. Ofelia Guilmáin died in Mexico City at the age of 83 from respiratory failure caused by pneumonia.

Plays

 Mientras me muero... pero de risa (2004)
 Los monólogos de la vagina ("The Vagina Monologues") (2002)
 The House of Bernarda Alba (2002)
 Los árboles mueren de pie (2000)
 Los reyes del mundo (1959)
 A ocho columnas
 Yocasta, o casi (1961)
 Compañeros
 Electra (by Sophocles) (1960)
 Medea (by Euripides) (1964)
 Las troyanas (1963)
 Los justos (1955)

 Miércoles de ceniza ("Ash Wednesday") (1956)
 El malentendido (1958)
 Juego de reinas (1962)
 Fuente Ovejuna (1963)
 María Tudor ("Mary Tudor") (1958)
 La maestra bebe un poco
 Bodas de sangre (1957)
 Un tal Judas (1955)
 La ronda de la hechizada (1968)
 La hidalga del valle (1954)
 La discreta enamorada (1954)
 Don Juan Tenorio (1953)
 Las mocedades del Cid (1953)
 La Celestina (1953)
 Isabel de Inglaterra ("Elizabeth of England") (1979)
 Debiera haber obispas
 Mujeres (1940)

Films

 Mi verdad (2004) as Juan Osorio's mother
 El patrullero 777 (1977)
 Celestina (1976) as Celestina
 El esperado amor desesperado (1976)
 Aquellos años (1974)
 El profeta Mimí (1973)
 El primer amor (1972)
 El negocio del odio (1972)
 The Garden of Aunt Isabel (1971)
 Misión cumplida (1970)
 Para servir a usted (1970)
 Las vírgenes locas (1970)
 ¿Por qué nací mujer? (1970) as Carmela
 Confesiones de una adolescente (1970)
 La muñeca perversa (1969)
 Siempre hay una primera vez (1969) (segment "Gloria")
 Flor marchita (1969) as Eugenia Almada

 Sor Ye-Ye (1967)
 Pánico (1966)
 Sangre en Río Bravo (1966)
 El escapulario (1966) as Maria Perez viuda de Fernandez
 El jinete justiciero en retando a la muerte (1966)
 Aquella Rosita Alvírez (1965)
 Los espadachines de la reina (1963)
 El ángel exterminador (1962) as Juana Avila
 El barón del terror (1962) as Senora Luis Meneses
 Quinceañera (1960)
 El caso de una adolescente (1958)
 El hombre y el monstruo (1958) as Mother
 Nazarín (1958) as Chanfa
 Mi desconocida esposa (1958)
 Flor de fango (1942)
 El Capitán Centellas (1941)
 Caperucita y Pulgarcito contra los monstruos (1962)

Telenovelas

 Amarte es mi pecado (2004) as Covadonga
 La otra (2002) as Sabina
 Siempre te amaré (2000) as Úrsula Castellanos
 Vivo por Elena (1998) as Luz
 El alma no tiene color (1997) as Alina
 Desencuentro (1997)
 La antorcha encendida (1996) as Doña Macaria de Soto
 Marisol (1996) as Zamira
 Agujetas de color de rosa (1994) as Bárbara
 Valentina (1993) as Dona Federica
 Milagro y magia (1991) as Rufina
 Días sin luna (1990) as Carlota Parlange
 Yesenia (1987) as Magneta
 Eclipse (1984) as Virginia
 Mañana es primavera (1982) as Doctora
 La divina Sarah (1980) as Sarah
 Marcha nupcial (1977) as Luisa
 Los bandidos del río frío (1976) as Calavera Catrina
 El manantial del milagro (1974) as Luz
 Mi primer amor (1973) as Doña Julia
 Sublime reducción (1971)

 La gata (1970) as Lorenza
 Yesenia (1970) as Trifenia
 Los caudillos (1968) as Felipa
 Lágrimas amargas (1967) as Carola Baida
 Obsesión (1967)
 El espejismo brillaba (1966)
 Las abuelas (1965)
 El refugio (1965)
 Casa de huéspedes (1965)
 Llamado urgente (1965)
 La vecindad (1964)
 Juicio de almas (1964)
 Doña Macabra (1963) as Demetria
 Encadenada (1962)
 Las momias de Guanajuato (1962)
 Divorciadas (1961)
 Espejo de sombras (1961)
 Caperucita y Pulgarcito contra los monstruos (1960)
 Cuidado con el ángel (1959, live)
 Cadenas de amor (1959, live)

See also
 Foreign-born artists in Mexico
 List of Spaniards
 List of Mexicans

External links
Profile  at esmas.com
Profile  at univision.com
Ofelia Guilmáin at the telenovela database

1921 births
2005 deaths
Actresses from Madrid
Mexican film actresses
Mexican stage actresses
Mexican television actresses
Spanish emigrants to Mexico
Deaths from pneumonia in Mexico
Deaths from respiratory failure